A banana belt is any segment of a larger geographic region that enjoys warmer weather conditions than the region as a whole, especially in the wintertime.  The term "banana belt" is broad enough that it can be used to describe everything from the entire Antarctic Peninsula, to the southern part of the American Midwest, to microclimate areas of mountain ranges.

Banana belts of the latter type may form on the lee sides of mountain slopes caused by orographic lift. When air rises over the top of a mountain range, it cools and releases moisture on the windward slope. As the air is pulled down the other side, it is compressed and heated via adiabatic heating, and it warms and dries territory in the mountain's rain shadow.

Examples of banana belts

Canada
 Whitehorse in the Yukon. 
 Windsor and Essex County in Ontario
 The Niagara Peninsula in Ontario.
Melita in Manitoba.
 The southern Gulf Islands in the Strait of Georgia in British Columbia
 Chatham-Kent municipality in Ontario.
 Victoria, British Columbia, along with Saanich, British Columbia, and surrounding areas in the region that forms Greater Victoria. It is considered the warmest metropolitan area in Canada, especially during the winter, with the fewest "frozen days".
Annapolis Royal in western part of Nova Scotia.
Yarmouth in southwestern Nova Scotia.
 Medicine Hat and Lethbridge in Alberta due to the influence of Chinook winds.
 The cities of Kelowna, Penticton, and Vernon in the Okanagan region.
 Osoyoos in the region of British Columbia Southern Interior.
 Creston in Central Kootenay of British Columbia.

United States
 Menominee, Escanaba, Manistique and Iron Mountain, Michigan are in the banana belt of the Upper Peninsula of Michigan.
 The Arkansas River Valley in Colorado, located in the Rocky Mountains, east of the Continental Divide and below the Sawatch Range of 14,000 foot peaks, is often referred to as a banana belt. It includes the towns of Buena Vista, Salida, Parkdale, Cañon City to Pueblo, Colorado.
 The portion of the Oregon Coast region south of Port Orford is known as "Oregon's Banana Belt" because of its mild climate in relation to the rest of the coast. The largest communities in this region are Brookings-Harbor and Gold Beach.
 Lewiston, Idaho, the Treasure Valley area around Nampa is known as Idaho's Banana Belt. With Lewiston located at the confluence of the Snake and Clearwater Rivers, it is known as the "Banana Belt of the Pacific Northwest". Residents enjoy year-round golfing, while being only a short drive away from skiing.
 La Conchita, California, is a literal banana belt, as a number of banana plantations were established there in the 1980s; bananas cannot ordinarily be grown on a commercial basis in California.
Guthrie & Audobon County Iowa, is a warmer than anywhere else is Western Iowa.  Last to freeze and first to thaw.

Europe
 Western Europe, and Northern Europe, including the United Kingdom and Ireland have mild winters due to the warming effects of the North Atlantic Current.

See also
Belt regions of the United States
Chinook wind
Foehn wind
Hardiness zone

References

Belt regions